Drammen og Omegn Busslinjer was a Norwegian bus company operating in Greater Drammen until 1999 when it was sold to Nettbuss because of financial difficulties and renamed Nettbuss Drammen. The company was owned by the municipalities of Drammen, Lier and Nedre Eiker in addition to the county of Buskerud. At the time of the sale the company had 180 employees.

External links
Private web site on Drammen buses

Defunct bus companies of Norway
Companies formerly owned by municipalities of Norway
Transport companies established in 1981
Transport companies disestablished in 2002
Norwegian companies established in 1981
2002 disestablishments in Norway
Companies based in Drammen
Former subsidiaries of Vy Buss
1999 mergers and acquisitions